High dynamic range (HDR) may refer to:

 High dynamic range, a general term describing dynamic range across multiple fields
 High-dynamic-range video, a technology related to HDR displays and formats such as HDR10, Dolby Vision, HDR10+, and others.
 High-dynamic-range rendering, techniques in computer-generated imagery
 Multi-exposure HDR capture, a technique for capturing high dynamic range images and videos

See also
 Dynamic range
 HDR (disambiguation)
 Standard-dynamic-range video
 Wide dynamic range